Madukka is a small village surrounded by forest located in the district of Kottayam, Kerala.

Geography
Madukka is a small village surrounded by dense forest and with hilly terrain.

Transport
The village is well accessed by road transportation and public transportation facilities are available to major towns like Kottayam and Changanacherry.
The nearest railway station is Kottayam Railway Station. The nearest airport is Cochin International Airport.
From Kottayam: Kottayam-Pampady-Ponkunnam-Kanjirappally-Mundakkayam-Madukka
From Changanacherry:  Changanacherry-Karukachal-Ponkunnam-Kanjirappally-Mundakkayam-Madukka

Economy
The main source of economy depend on cultivation and farming. The main crops are latex, pepper and seasonal fruits like banana.

Notable people
Molly Chacko

Places of worship
Puthenpally juma masjid, mahavishnu mahadeva Temple and St. Mathew's church are the important worship centres in Madukka. 
The population is predominantly Christian, Hindu, Muslim and Malayarayans.

Cultural centers
Sahrudaya Library and Sports Club

References

External links
http://lsgkerala.in/koruthodupanchayat/general-information/establishment/
http://www.whereincity.com/india/pincode/kerala/kottayam.htm Pin codes of Kottayam district].

Villages in Kottayam district